Señor Jim is a 1936 American Western film directed by Jacques Jaccard and starring Conway Tearle, Barbara Bedford and Alberta Dugan.

Cast
 Conway Tearle as Jim Stafford
 Barbara Bedford as Mona Cartier
 Alberta Dugan as Carole Cartier
 Fred Malatesta as Nick Zellini
 Betty Mack as Bunny Stafford
 Dirk Thane as Roxy Stone 
 Evelyn Hagara as Maysie
 Robert McKenzie as Sheriff Bob Arnett 
 Harrison Greene as Boomer
 Ashton and Co'ena as Dance Team
 Tove Linden as Adele Thorne
 Lloyd Brooks as Kent Hollis
 Budd Buster as Deputy 
 Jack Evans as Townsman

References

Bibliography
 Pitts, Michael R. Western Movies: A Guide to 5,105 Feature Films. McFarland, 2012.

External links
 

1936 films
1936 Western (genre) films
American black-and-white films
American Western (genre) films
Films directed by Jacques Jaccard
1930s English-language films
1930s American films